Murali Purushothaman is an Indian judge who is presently serving as a judge of Kerala High Court. The High Court of Kerala is the highest court in the Indian state of Kerala and in the Union Territory of Lakshadweep. The High Court of Kerala is headquartered at Ernakulam, Kochi

Career
After obtaining law degree from Government Law College, Ernakulam, Purushothaman enrolled as Advocate on 09.03.1991 and started practicing in Constitutional law and Service laws. During his practice, he served as Government Pleader in the High Court of Kerala from 13.03.2001 to 06.08.2001, Standing Counsel for the Kerala State Election Commission from 2000 and the Election Commission of India from 2004 till elevation as Judge, Standing Counsel for the State Co-operative Election Commission in 2002, Standing Counsel for the Delimitation Commission and Counsel for the Admission Supervisory Committee and Fee Regulatory Committee for Self Financing Professional Colleges and Institutions from 2007 to 2011. Elevated as Additional Judge of the High Court of Kerala on 25.02.2021 and became permeant judge from 06.06.2022.

References

External links
 High Court of Kerala

Living people
1967 births
Judges of the Kerala High Court
20th-century Indian judges